General elections were held in Pakistan on 7 December 1970 to elect members of the National Assembly. They were the first general elections since the independence of Pakistan and ultimately the only ones held prior to the independence of Bangladesh. Voting took place in 300 general constituencies, of which 162 were in East Pakistan and 138 in West Pakistan. A further thirteen seats were reserved for women (seven of which were in East Pakistan and six of which were in West Pakistan), who were to be elected by members of the National Assembly.

The elections were a fierce contest between two social democratic parties, the west-based Pakistan Peoples Party (PPP) and the east-based Awami League. The Awami League was the sole major party in the east wing, while in the west wing, the PPP faced severe competition from the conservative factions of Muslim League, the largest of which was Muslim League (Qayyum), as well as Islamist parties like Jamaat-e-Islami (JI), Jamiat Ulema-e-Islam (JUI) and Jamiat Ulema-e-Pakistan (JUP).

The result was a victory for the Awami League, which gained an absolute majority, winning 160 of the 162 general seats and all seven women's seats in East Pakistan. The PPP won only 81 general seats and five women's seats, all in West Pakistan. In the provincial elections held ten days later, the Awami League again dominated in East Pakistan, while the PPP were the winning party in Punjab and Sindh. The Marxist National Awami Party emerged victorious in Northwest Frontier Province and Balochistan.

The National Assembly was initially not inaugurated as President Yahya Khan and the PPP chairman Zulfikar Ali Bhutto did not want a party from East Pakistan in federal government. Instead, Yahya appointed the veteran Bengali politician Nurul Amin as Prime Minister, asking him to reach a compromise between the PPP and Awami League. However, this move failed as the delay in inauguration had already caused significant unrest in East Pakistan. The situation deteriorated further when a genocidal crackdown occurred under the orders of Yahya resulting in a civil war that led to the formation of the independent state of Bangladesh. The Assembly was eventually inaugurated in 1972 after Yahya resigned and handed power to Zulfikar Ali Bhutto. Bhutto became Prime Minister in 1973 after the post was recreated by a new constitution.

Background
On 23 March 1956, Pakistan changed from being a Dominion of the British Commonwealth and became an Islamic republic after framing its own constitution. Although the first general elections were scheduled for early 1959, severe political instability led President Iskander Mirza to abrogate the constitution on 7 October 1958. Mirza imposed martial law and handed power to the Commander-in-Chief of the Pakistan Army, General Muhammad Ayub Khan. After assuming presidency, President Ayub Khan promoted himself to the rank of Field marshal and appointed General Muhammad Musa Khan as the new Commander-in-Chief.

On 17 February 1960, President Ayub Khan appointed a commission under Muhammad Shahabuddin, the Chief Justice of Pakistan, to report a political framework for the country. The commission submitted its report on 29 April 1961, and on the basis of this report, a new constitution was framed on 1 March 1962. The new constitution, declaring the country as Republic of Pakistan, brought about a presidential system of government, as opposed to the parliamentary system of government under the 1956 Constitution. The electoral system was made indirect, and the "basic democrats" were declared electoral college for the purpose of electing members of the National and Provincial Assemblies. Under the new system, presidential elections were held on 2 January 1965 which resulted in a victory for Ayub Khan. As years went by, political opposition against President Ayub Khan mounted. In East Pakistan, leader of the Awami League, Sheikh Mujibur Rahman, was one of the key leaders to rally opposition to President Ayub Khan. In 1966, he began the Six point movement for East Pakistani autonomy.

In 1968, Sheikh Mujibur Rahman was charged with sedition after the government of President Ayub Khan accused him for conspiring with India against the stability of Pakistan. While a conspiracy between Mujib and India for East Pakistan's secession was not itself conclusively proven, it is known that Mujib and the Awami League had held secret meetings with Indian government officials in 1962 and after the 1965 war. This case led to an uprising in East Pakistan which consisted of a series of mass demonstrations and sporadic conflicts between the government forces and protesters. In West Pakistan, Zulfikar Ali Bhutto, who served as foreign minister under President Ayub Khan, resigned from his office and founded the Pakistan Peoples Party (PPP) in 1967. The socialist political party took up opposition to President Ayub Khan as well.

Ayub Khan succumbed to political pressure on 26 March 1969 and handed power to the Commander-in-Chief of the Pakistan Army, General Agha Muhammad Yahya Khan. President Yahya Khan imposed martial law and the 1962 Constitution was abrogated. On 31 March 1970, President Yahya Khan announced a Legal Framework Order (LFO) which called for direct elections for a unicameral legislature. Many in the West feared the East wing's demand for countrywide provincial autonomy. The purpose of the LFO was to secure the future Constitution which would be written after the election so that it would include safeguards such as preserving Pakistan's territorial integrity and Islamic ideology.

The integrated province of West Pakistan, which was formed on 22 November 1954, was abolished and four provinces were retrieved: Punjab, Sindh, Balochistan and the North-West Frontier Province. The principles of representation was made on the basis of population, and since East Pakistan had more population than the combined population of the four provinces of West Pakistan, the former got more than half seats in the National Assembly. Yahya Khan ignored reports that Sheikh Mujib planned to disregard the LFO and that India was increasingly interfering in East Pakistan. Nor did he believe that the Awami League would actually sweep the elections in East Pakistan.

A month before the election, the Bhola cyclone struck East Pakistan. This was the deadliest tropical cyclone in world history, killing an estimated 500,000 people. The government was severely criticised for its response to the disaster.

Parties and candidates
The general elections of 1970 are considered one of the fairest and cleanest elections in the history of Pakistan, with about twenty-four political parties taking part. The general elections presented a picture of a Two-party system, with the Awami League, a Bengali nationalist party, competing against the extremely influential and widely popular Pakistan Peoples Party, a leftist and democratic socialist party which had been a major power-broker in West Pakistan. The Pakistani government supported the pro-Islamic parties since they were committed to strong federalism. The Jamaat-e-Islami suspected that the Awami League had secessionist intentions.

Election campaign in East Pakistan

The continuous public meetings of the Awami League in East Pakistan and the Pakistan Peoples Party in Western Pakistan attracted huge crowds. The Awami League, a Bengali nationalist party, mobilised support in East Pakistan on the basis of its Six-Points Program (SPP), which was the main attraction in the party's manifesto.  In East Pakistan, a huge majority of the Bengali nation favoured the Awami League, under Sheikh Mujib. The party received a huge percentage of the popular vote in East Pakistan and emerged as the largest party in the nation as a whole, gaining the exclusive mandate of Pakistan in terms both of seats and of votes.

The Pakistan Peoples Party failed to win any seats in East Pakistan. On the other hand, the Awami League had failed to gather any seats in West Pakistan. The Awami League's failure to win any seats in the west was used by the leftists led by Zulfikar Bhutto who argued that Mujib had received "no mandate or support from West Pakistan" (ignoring the fact that he himself did not win any seat in East Pakistan).

The then leaders of Pakistan, all from West Pakistan and PPP leaders, strongly opposed the idea of an East Pakistani-led government. Many in Pakistan predicted that the Awami League-controlled government would oversee the passage of a new constitution with a simple majority. Bhutto uttered his infamous phrase "idhar hum, udhar tum" (We rule here, you rule there) – thus dividing Pakistan for the first time orally.

The same attitudes and emotions were also felt in East Pakistan whereas East-Pakistanis absorbed the feeling and reached to the conclusion that Pakistan had been benefited with economic opportunities, investments, and social growth would swiftly depose any East Pakistanis from obtaining those opportunities.

Some Bengalis sided with the Pakistan Peoples' Party and tacitly or openly supported Bhutto and the democratic socialists, such as Jalaludin Abdur Rahim, an influential Bengali in Pakistan and mentor of Bhutto, who was later jailed by Bhutto. Jamat-e-Islami, while supporting allowing the Awami League to form a government, was also against the fragmentation of the country. Conversely, several prominent figures from West Pakistan supported allowing the Awami League to rule, including the poet Faiz Ahmad Faiz and rights activist Malik Ghulam Jilani, father of Asma Jahangir, G.M Syed the founder of Sindhi nationalist party Jeay Sindh Qaumi Mahaz (JSQM) and Abul Ala Maududi, the leader of Jamat-e-Islami.

Elections in West Pakistan
However, the political position in West Pakistan was completely different from East Pakistan. In West Pakistan, the population was divided between different ideological forces. The right-wing parties, led under Abul Maududi, raised the religious slogans and initially campaigned on an Islamic platform, further promising to enforce Sharia laws in the country. Meanwhile, the founding party of Pakistan and the national conservative Muslim League, that although was divided into three factions (QML, CML, MLC), campaigned on a nationalist platform, promising to initiate the Jinnah reforms as originally envisioned by Jinnah and others in the 1940s. The factions however criticised each other for disobeying the rules laid down by the country's founding father.

The dynamic leadership and charismatic personality of Zulfikar Ali Bhutto was highly active and influential in West Pakistan during these days. Bhutto's ideas and the famous slogan "Roti Kapra Aur Makaan" ("Food, Clothing and Shelter") attracted poor communities, students, and the working class to his party. Under Bhutto's leadership the democratic left gathered and united into one party platform for the first time in Pakistan's history. Bhutto and the left-leaning elements attracted the people of the West to participate and vote for the Peoples Party based on a broad hope for a better future for their children and families. As compared to the right-wing and conservatives in West Pakistan, Bhutto and his allies won most of the popular vote, becoming the pre-eminent players in the politics of the West.

Nominations
A total of 1,957 candidates filed nomination papers for 300 National Assembly seats. After scrutiny and withdrawals, 1,579 eventually contested the elections. The Awami League ran 170 candidates, of which 162 were for constituencies in East Pakistan. Jamaat-e-Islami had the second-highest number of candidates with 151. The Pakistan Peoples Party ran only 120 candidates, of which 103 were from constituencies in Punjab and Sindh, and none in East Pakistan. The PML (Convention) ran 124 candidates, the PML (Council) 119 and the PML (Qayyum) 133.

All thirteen women's seats were uncontested.

Results
The government claimed a high level of public participation and a voter turnout of almost 63%. The total number of registered voters in the country was 56,941,500 of which 31,211,220 were from East Pakistan and 25,730,280 were from West Pakistan.

Elected members
List of members:

Aftermath
The elected Assembly initially did not meet as President Yahya Khan and the Pakistan Peoples Party did not want the majority party from East Pakistan forming government. This caused great unrest in East Pakistan. The military junta responded by executing a genocidal crackdown which led to the Bangladesh War of Independence, with East Pakistan becoming the independent state of Bangladesh. The Assembly session was eventually held when Yahya resigned four days after Pakistan surrendered in Bangladesh and Zulfikar Ali Bhutto took over. Bhutto became the Prime Minister of Pakistan in 1973, after the post was recreated by the new Constitution.

References

External links 
Detailed results

Pakistan
General
General elections in Pakistan
Election and referendum articles with incomplete results